Daniël Hendrik 'Daantjie' Rossouw (5 September 1930 – 28 January 2010) was a South African rugby union player.

Playing career
Rossouw finished his schooling at the Hoërskool Jan van Riebeeck in Cape Town, where after he moved to Pretoria to study at the University of Pretoria. He joined the University's rugby club and made his provincial debut for Northern Transvaal. In 1953, Rossouw relocated to Stellenbosch to further his law studies at Stellenbosch University and was he selected to represent Western Province.

Rossouw made his test debut for the Springboks in the third test match against the touring Australian team, captained by John Solomon on 19 September 1953 at Kingsmead in Durban. 
Rossouw's selection for this third test match was as a replacement for Tjol Lategan, who injured his shoulder in the previous test. He also played in the fourth test against the Australians and was set to continue as Springbok centre in the upcoming series against the British Lions. However, he decided to retire from rugby in the mid –1955, at a relatively young age of not yet twenty–five. Rossouw scored one test try for the Springboks.

Test history

See also
List of South Africa national rugby union players – Springbok no. 309

References

1930 births
2010 deaths
South African rugby union players
South Africa international rugby union players
Western Province (rugby union) players
Alumni of Hoërskool Jan van Riebeeck
People from Dawid Kruiper Local Municipality
Rugby union players from the Northern Cape
Rugby union centres